The 1998–99 season was the 97th in the history of the Western Football League.

The league champions for the fourth time in their history were Taunton Town, but runners-up Tiverton Town took promotion to the Southern League. The champions of Division One were Minehead Town.

Final tables

Premier Division
The Premier Division remained at 20 clubs after Chard Town and Torrington were relegated to the First Division. Two clubs joined:

Bishop Sutton, champions of the First Division.
Yeovil Town Reserves, runners-up in the First Division.

First Division
The First Division remained at 19 clubs after Bishop Sutton and Yeovil Town Reserves were promoted to the Premier Division, and Crediton United left the league. Three clubs joined:

Chard Town, relegated from the Premier Division.
Corsham Town, promoted from the Wiltshire League.
Torrington, relegated from the Premier Division.
Minehead changed their name to Minehead Town.

References

1998-99
8